This is a list of compositions by James Horner.

Film

1970s

1980s

1990s

2000s

2010s

Television
 1981 A Few Days in Weasel Creek
 1981 Angel Dusted
 1982 A Piano for Mrs. Cimino
 1982 Rascals and Robbers: The Secret Adventures of Tom Sawyer and Huckleberry Finn
 1983 Between Friends
 1985 Amazing Stories ("Alamo Jobe")
 1985 Surviving
 1990 Tales from the Crypt ("Cutting Cards")
 1990 Extreme Close-Up
 1992 Fish Police (theme and pilot episode)
 1992 Crossroads (theme)
 1999 Michelle Kwan Skates to Disney's Greatest Hits
 2000 Freedom Song
 2006 CBS Evening News

Short films
 1986 Captain EO
 1989 Tummy Trouble
 2012 First in Flight

Other
 2015 album Pas de Deux released in May 2015
 Pandora – The World of Avatar, theme park land and attractions; composed with Simon Franglen
 The score for THX's third promotional trailer, titled "Cimarron"
 The 1990-1997 Universal Studios fanfare
 The 1996 Imagine Entertainment fanfare
 Horner's Spider-Man theme briefly appeared in the 2021 film Spider-Man: No Way Home

References

Compositions by James Horner
Horner, James